Darshan Nagar is a  town in the Ayodhya district, Uttar Pradesh state in India.

References

 Cities and towns in Faizabad district